Sidin Sunny Vadukut is a columnist, writer and blogger from India. In January 2010, Vadukut's debut novel Dork: The Incredible Adventures of Robin 'Einstein' Varghese was published. This is the first part of the Dork trilogy and takes a satirical dig at the management consulting industry. The second installment in the trilogy – God Save the Dork – set in London was released in November 2011. The final edition – Who let the Dork Out – was out in the markets on 4 November 2012.

Personal life
Vadukut was born in a small village near Irinjalakuda on 30 April. He spent the most part of his childhood in Abu Dhabi and came back to India to pursue his higher education. An Engineer from Department of Metallurgy and Materials Engineering, National Institute of Technology,Tiruchirappalli, according to Sidin his father "bought him his MBA" from Indian Institute of Management Ahmedabad. He subsequently worked with the management consulting firm AT Kearney before writing 'Dork'. He currently lives in London, UK and is studying at Birkbeck, University of London. In September 2014 he appeared as a contestant on the BBC quiz show Mastermind. His specialist subject was champagne.

Works
Vadukut has written three books that comprise the Dork trilogy. The trilogy belong to the genre described as Office humor. The trilogy comprises  DORK: The Incredible Adventures of Robin ‘Einstein' Varghese, God Save The Dork and Who Let The Dork Out?

In 2014, Vadukut published his first non fiction book The Sceptical Patriot: Exploring the Truths Behind the Zero and Other Indian Glories. The book explores some of the most popular facts about India and digs out the truth behind them.

Vadukut contributes articles to various websites including Mint  and ESPN CricInfo

References

External links
 Sidin Sunny Vadukut's personal blog
 Review of Sidin Vadukut's 'God Save the Dork'
 Sidin Vadukut's Twitter

Journalists from Kerala
People from Thrissur district
Living people
Malayali people
National Institute of Technology, Tiruchirappalli alumni
Indian Institute of Management Ahmedabad alumni
Alumni of Birkbeck, University of London
1979 births